Our Lohja ( in Finnish: Meidän Lohja) is a local political party in the municipality of Lohja, Finland. In the 2004 municipal elections the party got 1204 votes (7.6%). It got four seats in the municipal council, Pekka Ilmarinen (258 personal preference votes), Saija Leikola (139 votes), Teuvo Laine (129 votes) and Pertti Märila (128 votes).

External links
 Party website

Local political parties in Finland